Hergest Ridge is a large elongated hill which traverses the border between England and Wales in the United Kingdom, between the town of Kington in Herefordshire and the village of Gladestry in Powys.  Its highest point, which is in England, is 426 metres high.

"Hergest" is pronounced to rhyme with 'hardest' with a hard "g" (as in "garden").

On Offa's Dyke Path 
The Offa's Dyke Path waymarked long distance footpath leads along the ridge.  The path passes close by the highest point of the ridge and the adjacent trig point.

Victorian racecourse 
A disused Victorian circular country racecourse is sited on the hill. It is clearly marked on Ordnance Survey maps and is still visible on the ground. The racecourse was popular between 1825 and 1846.  It replaced an earlier racecourse on nearby Bradnor Hill just to the north of Kington town, which dates from 1770. Horse races continued here in the summer until around 1880. With the panoramic views on all sides, they were popular with the local gentry, squirearchy and farming community.

Upland sheep grazing 
During the Second World War the hill was cultivated, but has now reverted to rough sheep grazing and moorland, and is partly covered by bracken and gorse.

Inspiration 
The ridge inspired an album by English multi-instrumentalist Mike Oldfield, Hergest Ridge. Oldfield was a resident of the area during the writing and recording of his albums Hergest Ridge and Ommadawn. Ommadawn was actually recorded in his nearby house, The Beacon.  The albums were reissued with bonus material in June 2010.

At the end of Ommadawn is a short song entitled On Horseback.  The last lines of the lyrics are as follows: 
So if you feel a little glum, to Hergest Ridge you should come.  In summer, winter, rain or sun, it's good to be on horseback.

References

Marilyns of England
Hills of Herefordshire
Mountains and hills of Powys
Marilyns of Wales

pl:Hergest Ridge